St. Lawrence Catholic Church  is a parish of the Archdiocese of Dubuque. It is located in rural Jackson County, Iowa, United States, in Otter Creek Township. It was listed on the National Register of Historic Places in 1992.

The parish's first church building was a small stone structure completed in 1866. It soon became too small and a frame Methodist Church nearby was bought to house the growing congregation. The present church building, completed in 1883, was designed by Dubuque architect Fridolin Heer. It is constructed in limestone in the Gothic Revival style. The tower is capped by an octagon-shaped belfry and spire. There is a Gothic arched window in the tower above the main entrance and in each of the six bays on the sides. The main facade is the south elevation and on the opposite side of the church is a rose window.

References

Religious organizations established in 1854
Roman Catholic churches completed in 1883
19th-century Roman Catholic church buildings in the United States
Churches in the Roman Catholic Archdiocese of Dubuque
Gothic Revival church buildings in Iowa
Churches in Jackson County, Iowa
Churches on the National Register of Historic Places in Iowa
National Register of Historic Places in Jackson County, Iowa
1854 establishments in Iowa